Plastindia International University is located in Dunga, Vapi, Gujarat, India. It is an industry specific university dedicated to plastics.It was founded in 2016 and is recognized by the University Grants Commission.

References

External links

Private universities in India
Universities in Gujarat
Educational institutions established in 2016
2016 establishments in Gujarat
Plastics industry organizations
Vapi
Plastics industry in India